Fuchs-Park-Stadion is an athletics stadium in Bamberg, Germany.

History
The stadium was built in 1926 and has undergone renovations in 2008 and 2009, making the seating capacity 5,200. In 2009 the city of Bamberg made an agreement with bakery company Fuchs, changing the stadium name changed to Fuchs-Park-Stadion until 2019.

Other uses
Eintracht Bamberg use this stadium for their home games.

References

Football venues in Germany
Buildings and structures in Bamberg
Sports venues in Bavaria
Sport in Upper Franconia
1926 establishments in Germany
Sports venues completed in 1926